Testudoflexoolithus is an oogenus of fossil turtle egg, containing two oospecies: T. bathonicae and T. agassizi.

References

Fossil parataxa described in 1996
Egg fossils